The Barbara Jefferis Award is an Australian literary award prize. The award was created in 2007 after being endowed by John Hinde upon his death to commemorate his late wife, author Barbara Jefferis. It is funded by his $1 million bequest. Originally an annual award, it has been awarded biennially since 2012.

Jefferis was an Australian writer, and a founding member and first female president of the Australian Society of Authors. She died in 2004. Australian author, Tom Keneally, described Jefferis as "a rare being amongst authors, being both a fine writer but also organisationally gifted".

The Award, which comprises $50,000 for the winner with $5,000 distributed amongst the shortlist, is one of Australia's richest literary prizes. It is awarded to "the best novel written by an Australian author that depicts women and girls in a positive way or otherwise empowers the status of women and girls in society". The novel can be in any genre and does not have to be set in Australia. The award does not specify the author's gender.  It is administered by the Australian Society of Authors and is expected to rival the Miles Franklin Award ($42,000) and the biennial Tasmania Pacific Fiction Prize ($40,000).

The prize was first awarded in 2008 to Rhyll McMaster for Feather Man (Brandl & Schlesinger).

Controversy

The announcement of the award caused a minor controversy in Australian literary circles due to its target. Susan Wyndham, journalist and literary editor, best summarises the issue in the questions opening her article in The Sydney Morning Herald Blogs: "Does Australia need a new fiction award that encourages 'positive' portrayals of women and girls? Or is it an outdated gesture in a post-feminist culture rich with female authors, characters and readers?"

Wyndham reports Rosalind Hinde, daughter of John Hinde and Barbara Jefferis, as saying that her father had "the very clear and strong intention to honour my mother's writing, her feminism and her devotion to other writers". Several writers have supported the award, including Tom Keneally, Helen Garner, Frank Moorhouse, Gerald Murnane, Anne Deveson, Kerryn Goldsworthy and Brian Castro. However, writer and critic, Andrew Reimer dislikes the idea of focusing on "social agenda" over "novelist's skill and imagination", and novelist Emily McGuire agreed, stating that she doesn't "like the idea of judging fiction based on its message". Author and critic, Debra Adelaide, expressed her concern that the award might encourage "safe and constrained" writing and wondered whether "we are getting to the point where we have more awards than publishing opportunities".

Winners
 2008 – Feather Man, Rhyll McMaster, Brandl & Schlesinger, Blackheath, 
 2009 – The Spare Room, Helen Garner, Text, Melbourne, 
 2010 – The China Garden, Kristina Olsson, University of Queensland Press, 
 2011 – Come Inside, G.L. Osborne, Clouds of Magellan 
 2012 – All That I Am, Anna Funder
 2013 – not awarded. The 2014 award was for 2013/2014
 2014 – Sea Hearts, Margo Lanagan AND The Night Guest, Fiona McFarlane
 2016 – Hope Farm, Peggy Frew
 2018 – The Trapeze Act, Libby Angel, Text, Melbourne
2020 – Wolfe Island, Lucy Treloar, Pan Macmillan Australia

Shortlisted works
Winners are listed in bold type.

2008 
 The Anatomy of Wings, Karen Foxlee, University of Queensland Press, St Lucia, 
 Feather Man, Rhyll McMaster, Brandl & Schlesinger, Blackheath, 
 The Seamstress, Geraldine Wooller, University of Western Australia Press, Perth, 
 The Lost Dog, Michelle de Kretser, Allen & Unwin, Sydney, 
 Burning In, Mireille Juchau, Giramondo, Sydney, 
 The Gospel of Gods and Crocodiles, Elizabeth Stead, University of Queensland Press, St Lucia,

2009 
 People of the Book, Geraldine Brooks, Fourth Estate (HarperCollins), Sydney,  
 The Spare Room, Helen Garner, Text, Melbourne, 
 The Lifeboat, Zacharey Jane, University of Queensland Press, St Lucia, 
 Addition, Toni Jordan, Text, Melbourne, 
 The Good Parents, Joan London, Vintage (Random House), Sydney, 
 The Last Sky, Alice Nelson, Fremantle Press, Fremantle,

2010 
 The Lost Life, Steven Carroll, HarperCollins, 
 Swimming, Enza Gandolfo, Vanark Press, 
 The World Beneath, Cate Kennedy, Scribe, 
 The China Garden, Kristina Olsson, University of Queensland Press (UQP), 
 Headlong, Susan Varga, UWA Publishing,

2011 
 The Good Daughter, Honey Brown, Penguin/Viking, 
 Like Being a Wife, Catherine Harris, Vintage, 
 Sustenance, Simone Lazaroo, University of Western Australia Press, 
 Indelible Ink, Fiona McGregor, Scribe, 
 Come Inside, G.L. Osborne, Clouds of Magellan,

2012 
 Too Close to Home, Georgia Blain, Vintage
 When We Have Wings, Claire Corbett, Allen & Unwin
 All That I Am, Anna Funder, Penguin
 Five Bells, Gail Jones, Vintage
 Foal's Bread, Gillian Mears, Allen & Unwin
 Cold Light, Frank Moorhouse, Vintage

2014 
 Sufficient Grace, Amy Espeseth, Scribe Publications
 The Life and Loves of Lena Gaunt, Tracy Farr, Fremantle Press
 The Pilgrimage, Jacinta Halloran, Scribe Publications
 Sea Hearts, Margo Lanagan, Allen & Unwin
 The Night Guest, Fiona McFarlane, Penguin
 The First Week, Margaret Merrilees, Wakefield Press
 The Mountain, Drusilla Modjeska

2016 
 This Picture of You, Sarah Hopkins, Allen & Unwin
 A Guide to Berlin, Gail Jones, Vintage
 Laurinda, Alice Pung, Black Inc.
 The Protected, Claire Zorn, University of Queensland Press
 Hope Farm, Peggy Frew, Scribe Publications
 The Natural Way of Things, Charlotte Wood, Allen & Unwin

2018 
 The Trapeze Act, Libby Angel, Text
 Troppo, Madelaine Dickie, Fremantle Press
 Storyland, Catherine McKinnon, HarperCollins
 From the Wreck, Jane Rawson, Transit Lounge
 Goodwood, Holly Throsby, Allen & Unwin

2020 
 The White Girl, Tony Birch, University of Queensland Press
 Too Much Lip, Melissa Lucashenko, University of Queensland Press
 There Was Still Love, Favel Parrett Hachette
 Wolfe Island, Lucy Treloar, Picador
 The Yield, Tara June Winch, Hamish Hamilton

2022 
 Bodies of Light, Jennifer Down, Text
 Ordinary Matter, Laura Elvery, University of Queensland Press
 Benevolence, Julie Janson, Magabala
 Revenge: Murder in three parts, S. L. Lim, Transit Lounge
 Smart Ovens for Lonely People, Elizabeth Tan, Brio
 The Bass Rock, Evie Wyld, Penguin

See also

 List of literary awards honoring women

Notes

References
James Bennett (Firm) "Australian Society of Authors: Barbara Jefferis Award" Accessed: 2 September 2007
Wyndham, Susan (2007) "Rich new award for feminist fiction" in The Sydney Morning Herald Blogs: Entertainment Accessed: 1 September 2007

Australian fiction awards
Literary awards honoring women
Awards established in 2007
2007 establishments in Australia